Nushu is a Unicode block containing characters from the Nüshu script, which is a syllabary derived from Chinese characters that was used exclusively among women in Jiangyong County in Hunan province of southern China.

An iteration mark for Nüshu is encoded in the Ideographic Symbols and Punctuation block at U+16FE1.

For technical reasons "Nüshu" is spelled as "Nushu" in the Unicode Standard. Nüshu characters do not have descriptive character names, but have names derived algorithmically from their code point value (e.g. U+1B170 is named NUSHU CHARACTER-1B170).

Block

History
The following Unicode-related documents record the purpose and process of defining specific characters in the Nushu block:

References 

Unicode blocks